George Edward Shipley (April 21, 1927 – June 28, 2003) was a U.S. Representative from Illinois.

Born in Richland County, near Olney, Illinois, Shipley attended the East Richland High School, Olney, Illinois. He graduated from Olney High School, Olney, Illinois, 1950. He served in the United States Marine Corps from 1944 to 1947. A business owner, he was Chief deputy sheriff of Richland County, Illinois from 1950 to 1954 and sheriff 1954–1958.

Shipley was elected as a Democrat to the Eighty-sixth and to the nine succeeding Congresses (January 3, 1959 to January 3, 1979). He notably defeated conservative activist Phyllis Schlafly in 1970 by 91,158 votes (53.97%) to 77,762 (46.04%). He was not a candidate for re-election in 1978 to the Ninety-sixth Congress.

Shipley died on June 28, 2003, in Olney, Illinois.

References

1927 births
2003 deaths
People from Olney, Illinois
Illinois sheriffs
United States Marines
Democratic Party members of the United States House of Representatives from Illinois
20th-century American politicians